Yohann Sangaré (born April 5, 1983) is a French professional basketball player who currently plays ASVEL Basket of the LNB Pro A.

Professional career
Sangare played in French League for ASVEL Basket, STB Le Havre, Orléans Loiret Basket and Chorale Roanne Basket. He also played two seasons in Italian Lega Basket Serie A for Armani Jeans Milano and Carife Ferrara.

National team
Sangaré played for the France national basketball team at the FIBA EuroBasket 2007.

References

External links 
Eurobasket.com Profile 
FIBA.com Profile

1983 births
Living people
ASVEL Basket players
CB Valladolid players
Chorale Roanne Basket players
French men's basketball players
Liga ACB players
Olimpia Milano players
Orléans Loiret Basket players
People from Poissy
STB Le Havre players
UB La Palma players
Melilla Baloncesto players
Sportspeople from Yvelines
Guards (basketball)